Federation of Nigeria Official Gazette was the government gazette for the Colony and Protectorate of Nigeria (1954 to 1960) and of the Federal Republic of Nigeria for the first three years of its existence (1960-63). It was published at Lagos.

It replaced The Nigeria Gazette and was continued by the Federal Republic of Nigeria Official Gazette.

See also
List of British colonial gazettes

References

External links
Nigeria official publications at the British Library

Publications established in 1954
Publications disestablished in 1963
Colonial Nigeria
History of Nigeria
Government gazettes of Nigeria